Zohra Sarwari is a Muslim author, life and business coach, entrepreneur, and international speaker living in Sacramento, CA, United States. She is the author of more than 14 books and many E-books.

Early life
Sarwari was born in Afghanistan and moved to America at the age of 6 with her parents. Her family spoke little English when they first arrived and started out working in low-paying jobs to make ends meet.
She later attended public schools in New York, Virginia and California.

In print and electronic media
 In a Southern California InFocus interview she was exemplified as a working mother; homeschooling her three children while also pursuing her career. Her workload includes both running her own website offering life and business coaching services, and studying for a Bachelor of Arts degree in Islam.
 She has participated in the Meet the Author Program of ISNA She has been interviewed on Ariana International, Noor TV, and Payame Afghan TV
 Her book, 9 Steps To Achieve Your Destiny, has been reviewed in Azizah and Al-Jumuah magazines.
 She spoke at the Fit Muslimah Summit (2008).
 Zohra Sarwari is a member of Islamic Writers Alliance. Zohra Sarwari has been interviewed on Radio Islam as well where she talked about her new published books.
 She has been interviewed by Productive Muslim as a "Productive Muslimah". Zohra's recently published books can also be seen on MuslimReview Online.
 She has been interviewed on CBS News as a Muslim Speaker. Zohra  did an interview for Fox News She has done numerous Radio Shows as well.
 Zohra did an article for MuslimMatters.org MuslimMatters.org.
 She has  been interviewed on FOX NEWS.
 She was awarded "The Best Woman of 2009" by Noor TV.
 She was interviewed by KIMT CBS news.
 She is also supporting a Hifz school By Charity Right.
  Sarwari runs a publishing company called Eman Publishing.

Books authored
 9 Steps To Achieve Your Destiny (Revised Edition)
 Are Muslim Women Oppressed?
 Imagine that Today is YOUR Last Day
 NO! I AM NOT A TERRORIST!
 Powerful Time Management Skills for Muslims
 Speaking Skills Every Muslim Must Know
 Who Am I?
 The Amazing Kid Entrepreneur
 The Key Strategies That Can Make Anyone A Successful Leader
 A Chance To Live
 Reading Curriculum
 The Power of Reading
 Pre-K Curriculum
 K-Curriculum
 100 Hadiths for Kids Ages 7-9
 100 Hadiths for Kids Ages 10-12
 25 Stories with Moral for Kids Ages 7-9 -Short Stories with Great Morals for Muslims
 The Inheritance A Journey To China
 The Inheritance A Journey To Russia
 The Inheritance A Journey To Afghanistan
 The Inheritance A Journey To Africa

Published articles
 Why Do Muslim Women Wear the Headscarf (Hijab)? 
 How to Pass an Interview 
 How to Do More and Give More 
 4 Tips to Improve Your Concentration 
 6 Ways to Decrease Stress
 The Best Jobs For Teens 
 5 Powerful Tips to Improve Teen Self Esteem 
 How to Become a Great Speaker 
 How to Manage Your Time 
 Should I Home School? 
 How to Survive College

References

External links
 Zohra Sarwari
 Muslim Woman Speaker  
 SuperCharge HomeSchooling

American motivational speakers
Women motivational speakers
American self-help writers
Living people
University of California, Davis alumni
Year of birth missing (living people)
Place of birth missing (living people)
People from Fishers, Indiana
People from Sacramento, California